Okoro is a surname of Igbo origin with a meaning of "greatness", especially in one's character. Notable people with the name include:

Surname 
Christopher Okoro Cole, (1921–c.1990), Sierra Leonean government official
Dawn Okoro, American artist
Fidelis Okoro, Nigerian politician
Isaac Okoro (born 2001), American basketball player
Kenny Okoro, American football player
Marilyn Okoro, British athlete
Osas Okoro, Nigerian footballer
Sandie Okoro (born 1964), British lawyer
Stanley Okoro, Nigerian footballer
Sunday Patrick Okoro, Nigerian footballer

Given name 
Okoro Idozuka, 19th-century Nigerian leader

See also
Ikot Okoro, Nigerian village
Okoro Oilfield, Nigerian offshore oilfield

References

Igbo names